CityLights is a 2014 Indian drama film directed by Hansal Mehta starring Rajkummar Rao and actress Patralekha in the lead roles. It is a remake of the BAFTA nominated British film Metro Manila (2013). The film was presented by Fox Star Studios in association with Mahesh Bhatt and Mukesh Bhatt.

The story is about a poor farmer from Rajasthan coming to Mumbai in search of livelihood. The film released on 30 May 2014, and won rave reviews from most critics. In spite of releasing in just 350 screens, CityLights became a success due to its low cost of production and consistent collections at the box office.

Plot
Deepak Singh's (played by Rajkumar Rao) life as a former driver in the Indian Army in a village in Rajasthan who owns a garment store is tangled in the web of poverty, hope and despair. Deepak's family consists of his ever-supporting wife, Rakhi (played by Patralekha), and their little daughter, Mahi. They tag along his journey to Mumbai as he is unable to repay the money he owes for his store. With no contacts or addresses, except that of his friend Omkar, Deepak takes extreme measures to search for him when arriving to Mumbai.

Deepak is tricked by two con-men who offer to sell him a flat for Rs 10,000 and decamp with the money. With no details on them, the Mumbai police refuse to file an F.I.R. His wife meets an escort working at a night bar who provides them space in a building under construction as temporary accommodation, and convinces her to work as a bar dancer until Deepak finds a job.

Deepak gets hired as a driver for a privately owned security bureau with a monthly pay of Rs 15,000. Deepak's senior colleague, Vishnu (played by Manav Kaul) realizes that he is gullible, and does various favours for him in order to gain his trust. Vishnu later reveals a plans to loot a parcel being transported by the security agency. When Deepak vehemently opposes the idea of the theft, Vishnu blackmails him by revealing that he has hidden a box that he previously stole, in Deepak's house. Feeling cornered, Deepak agrees to the risky plan of stealing the keys for this box. However, Vishnu is attacked and killed in the course of the robbery. Meanwhile, Rakhi loses her job. Deepak finds the box stolen by his senior in his house and comes up with a plan to ensure Rakhi and Mahi's safe return to their village.

The movie ends when his attempt to steal the keys from the agency cost him his life but through a shrewd tactic he is able to pass on Rakhi the imprint of the key for the stolen box. Rakhi and Mahi return to the village with Rakhi lost in memory of Deepak and their happy past.

Cast
 Rajkummar Rao as Deepak Singh
 Patralekha as Rakhi Singh
 Manav Kaul as Vishnu
 Sadiya Siddiqui as Sudha
 Pramod Pathak as Boss Mhatre
 Khushboo Upadhyay as Sonali
 Resh Lamba as Waqar

Production
CityLights marked actress Anwita Paul's debut, known by her screen name Patralekha. As Paul was in a relationship with the lead actor Rao, the production house did not disclose her name until the trailer was released. When press kept questioning about the lead actress, the filmmakers dismissed the question.

While the film was originally set to be directed by Ajay Bahl, due to creative differences he was replaced by Hansal Mehta. In December 2013, it was announced that shooting would begin in Rajasthan.

The film was first scheduled to release on 1 May 2014, which was subsequently shifted to 30 May. On 5 May 26 minutes of footage was previewed at a Mumbai event.

Soundtrack

The songs were composed by Jeet Gannguli with lyrics by Rashmi Singh. Rashmi Singh received Best Lyricist award at the 60th Filmfare Awards for her lyrics to the song "Muskurane."

The film score was composed by Raju Singh.

Track listing

Critical reception

Times of India reviews the cinematography of "Citylights" by Dev Agarwal is wonderful. Shots of the family sleeping against a rubbish pile, a '3BHK' in a construction site, Deepak staring at an ocean of pure despair, a fallen cycle in a courtyard, stand out. The family's migration stays with you as a vivid new experience – but its city sojourn occasionally reminds you of familiar moments.

Sweta Kaushal writes in a Hindustan Times review that Hansal Mehta's direction makes Citylights "intensely gripping and thought-provoking, the interplay of emotions and how the couple copes with city's hardships are the high points of the film."

Box office
The film collected  against a similar production budget.

Awards and nominations

References

External links
 
 
 Citylights: 2nd Week Box Office Collections at Koimoi.com

2014 films
Films scored by Jeet Ganguly
2014 drama films
2010s Hindi-language films
Indian crime drama films
Indian remakes of British films
Films set in Mumbai
Films shot in Rajasthan
Fox Star Studios films
Indian avant-garde and experimental films
Films with screenplays by Ritesh Shah
2010s avant-garde and experimental films